Cone cGMP-specific 3',5'-cyclic phosphodiesterase subunit alpha' is an enzyme that in humans is encoded by the PDE6C gene.

References

Further reading

External links 
  GeneReviews/NIH/NCBI/UW entry on Achromatopsia
  OMIM entries on Achromatopsia